Thomas Legh Claughton (6 November 1808 – 25 July 1892) was a British academic, poet, and clergyman.  He was professor of poetry at Oxford University from 1852 to 1857; Bishop of Rochester; and the first Bishop of St Albans.

Biography
Claughton was born at Haydock Lodge in Haydock, then in Lancashire.  He was the son of Lancashire MP Thomas Claughton and his wife, Maria. Educated at The King's School, Chester and Rugby School, he was admitted in 1826 to Trinity College, Oxford, where he took a first in Literae Humaniores in 1831.

Remaining at Oxford, he held the post of select preacher to the University four times between 1841 and 1868 and from 1852 to 1857 he held the office of Professor of Poetry.

Ordained in 1834, Claughton was assigned no cure until 1841, when he was appointed vicar of Kidderminster.  This post he held for 26 years and was widely acclaimed for his work. In April 1867, Claughton was nominated Bishop of Rochester on the recommendation of Lord Derby, for whose installation as Chancellor of Oxford Claughton had written an ode.

In 1877, the Diocese of St Albans was created.  Essentially land north of the Thames in the counties of Essex and Hertfordshire, previously ministered under Claughton's see, the Diocese of Rochester, formed the new diocese. Possibly as he already resided in the newly created Diocese, Claughton chose to become the first Bishop of St Albans, a post which he held until 1890.

Family
Claughton married the Honourable Julia Susannah Ward, eldest daughter of the 10th Lord Ward and had five sons and four daughters:

 Amelia Maria Claughton (1843–1894), who married 1st Augustus Henry Archibald Anson and 2nd George John Douglas Campbell, 8th Duke of Argyll
 Hyacinthe Anne Claughton (1844–1845)
 William Claughton (1845–1860)
 The Rev. Canon Thomas Legh Claughton (1846–1915), a clergyman who married Henrietta Louisa Horatia Mildmay, granddaughter of Sir Henry St John-Mildmay, 4th Bart.
 Katharine Susannah Claughton (1848–1934), who married Ronald George Elidor Campbell, son of the 2nd Earl of Cawdor
 The Rev. Piers Leopold Claughton (1850–1939), a clergyman
 Lucy Ellinor Claughton (1852–1939)
 Robert Dudley Claughton (1854–1855)
 Sir Gilbert Henry Claughton, 1st Bart. (1856–1921), a businessman and politician

From his enthronement as 98th Bishop of Rochester to his resignation from the bishopric of St Albans in 1890, Claughton resided at Danbury Palace (near Chelmsford), where he died. It was a distinguished occupancy as his elder daughter, Amelia, married (for her second time) the Duke of Argyll at a ceremony at the Palace. He is buried in St Albans Cathedral.

His widow died at the Priory, Dudley, on 28 May 1902, aged 84.

Selected works
"Voyages of Discovery to the Polar Regions" (1829), poem – winner of the Newdigate prize for 1829
Questions on the Collects, Epistles, and Gospels (1853–57), 2 vols.

References

External links
 Bibliographic directory from Project Canterbury

1808 births
1892 deaths
Alumni of Trinity College, Oxford
Bishops of Rochester
Bishops of St Albans
Fellows of Trinity College, Oxford
People educated at Rugby School
People from Winwick, Cheshire
19th-century Church of England bishops
Burials at St Albans Cathedral
People educated at The King's School, Chester
Oxford Professors of Poetry
English male poets
19th-century English poets
19th-century male writers